The following list of people from Hartford, Connecticut, includes people who were born in, lived in or are otherwise closely connected with the city:

Actors
Robert Ames (1889–1931), stage and screen actor 
Ben Cooper, best known for western films and television appearances in the 1960s and 70s
Jenna Dewan (born 1980), actress
Linda Evans (born 1942), actress, best known for Dynasty 
Thomas Ian Griffith (born 1962), actor, martial artist, best known for playing Terry Silver in The Karate Kid Part III and Cobra Kai
Katharine Hepburn (1907–2003), iconic Oscar-winning actress; buried in the Hepburn family plot in Cedar Hill Cemetery
Elyse Knox (1917–2012), model and actress; wife of Tom Harmon and mother of Mark Harmon
Eriq La Salle (born 1962), of the television show ER
Charles Nelson Reilly (1931–2007), actor, director and TV personality
Ed Begley
Tony Todd, Broadway, film and television actor

Others in arts and entertainment
Amy Brenneman (born 1964), actress, best known for the television series Judging Amy
Brooke Burke (born 1971), television personality, model and dancer
August Coppola, academic, film executive and father of Nicolas Cage
Ann Corio (1914–1999), burlesque star
Totie Fields (1930–1978), comedian
Michael C. FitzGerald (born 1953), art historian and Picasso scholar at Trinity College in Hartford
Kathleen Kucka, abstract painter
Norman Lear (born 1922), television producer
Stephanie McMahon, businesswoman, professional wrestling personality
Ken Ober, host of Remote Control
Ken Richters (born 1955), stage actor, playwright, and voice actor, known for impersonations of Mark Twain
Phil Tonken (1919–2000), announcer at New York station WOR-AM-TV
Wavy Gravy, hippie icon 
 Emily Wright (born 1980), songwriter, producer and engineer
Kim Zolciak (born 1978), star of The Real Housewives of Atlanta, country music singer

Scientists
 Barbara McClintock (1902–1992), cytogeneticist, awarded the 1983 Nobel Prize in Physiology or Medicine
 Alexander Rich (1925–2015),  biologist and biophysicist
 Paul Schimmel (b. 1940), biophysical chemist and translational medicine pioneer

Musicians
Igor Buketoff (1915–2001), conductor
Kurt Carr, gospel music composer and performer
Fates Warning, progressive metal band formed in 1982
Charles Flores (1970–2012), jazz bassist and member of the Michel Camilo Trio
Grayson Hugh, singer-songwriter
Natália Kelly, singer 
Barbara Kolb (born 1939), composer
Mark McGrath (born 1968), lead singer of Sugar Ray
Jackie McLean (1931–2006), jazz alto saxophonist and educator
Notch, R&B, dancehall and Reggaeton artist
Gene Pitney (1940–2006), singer
Jeff Porcaro (1954–1992), Mike Porcaro (1955–2015) and Steve Porcaro (born 1957), of the rock band Toto
Joe Porcaro, jazz drummer; father of Jeff and Steve Porcaro
Doobie Powell gospel musician and pastor
Sophie Tucker (1884–1966), "last of the red-hot mamas," singer and comedian

Writers
Steven Anzovin, non-fiction writer best known for his Famous First Facts book series
Bill Branon, novelist
Oliver Butterworth (1915–1990), children's author and educator
Suzanne Collins (born 1962), author of the Hunger Games trilogy 
Lyn Crost (1915–1997), World War II correspondent
Tom Curry (1900–1976), pulp fiction writer
Mary Ann Hanmer Dodd (1813–1878), poet
Dominick Dunne (1925–2009) and John Gregory Dunne (1932–2003), writers
Austin Gary, novelist
William Gillette (1853–1937), actor, director, famed for playing Sherlock Holmes on stage
Stephenie Meyer (born 1973), author of Twilight series novels 
Jim Murray (1919–1998), Pulitzer Prize-winning sports columnist of the Los Angeles Times 
Greensbury Washington Offley (1808–1896), slave narrative author and minister 
Lydia Sigourney (1791-1865), poet
Wallace Stevens (1879–1955), poet; insurance executive  
Harriet Beecher Stowe (1811–1896), author of Uncle Tom's Cabin, settled in Hartford during the 1870s; her Nook Farm home is open to the public and adjoins Mark Twain's
Mark Twain (real name Samuel Langhorne Clemens) (1835–1910), iconic author, the Mark Twain House is a national historic site; wrote many of his most famous works in Hartford, including The Gilded Age, The Adventures of Tom Sawyer, A Connecticut Yankee in King Arthur's Court, Roughing It, The Adventures of Huckleberry Finn
Mary E. Van Lennep (1821–1844), missionary, school founder, memoirist
Ocean Vuong (born 1988), poet and novelist,  author of On Earth Were Briefly Gorgeous

Government and politics
Parmenio Adams (1776–1832), United States Congressman; born in Hartford
James J. Barbour (1869–1946), Illinois lawyer and state legislator; born in Hartford
L. Paul Bremer (born 1941), ex-administrator of US-occupied Iraq and foreign service officer
Harold V. Camp (1935–2022), Connecticut lawyer, state legislator, and businessman
 Charles R. Chapman, mayor of Hartford, served in both houses of Connecticut legislature
Horace S. Cooley, Illinois Secretary of State
William A. DiBella, Majority Leader of the Connecticut State Senate
Frank Fasi, mayor of Honolulu, Hawaii
George A. French, Minnesota state legislator and lawyer
Elizabeth Bartlett Grannis (1840–1926), suffragist, social reformer, editor
Frank A. Hooker, Chief Justice of the Michigan Supreme Court
Thomas Hooker, founder of Connecticut
Bruce Hyer, Green Party of Canada Member of Parliament
Wilfred X. Johnson (1920–1972), first African American elected to the Connecticut General Assembly
A. Lucille Matarese, Connecticut state legislator and Roman Catholic Benedictine nun
Edward Ralph May (1819–1852), only delegate to Indiana Constitutional Convention of 1850 to vote in favor of African American suffrage
Elizabeth May, former Sierra Club of Canada president and former leader of the Green Party of Canada
Alice Merritt (1876–1950), first woman to serve in the Connecticut State Senate (1925–1929); represented Hartford
Lewis Rome (1933–2015), Connecticut State Senate leader and Republican Party nominee in the 1982 Connecticut gubernatorial election 
Maria W. Stewart, abolitionist
Thomas A. Sullivan, Wisconsin State Assemblyman
Elmer Watson, US Army officer and Connecticut State Senate majority leader

Sports
Michael Adams (born 1963), NBA player
Nick Bonino (born 1988), NHL player
Marcus Camby (born 1974), NBA player
John Carney (born 1964), NFL placekicker
Andre Drummond (born 1993), NBA player for the Los Angeles Lakers
Jayson Durocher (born 1974), MLB player for the Milwaukee Brewers
Johnny Egan (born 1939), NBA player
Dwight Freeney (born 1980), NFL player
Craig Janney (born 1968), NHL player
Tyrique Jones (born 1997), basketball player for Hapoel Tel Aviv in the Israeli Basketball Premier League
Rick Mahorn (born 1958), NBA player
Eric Mangini (born 1971), head coach of Cleveland Browns and New York Jets
Cliff Olander (born 1955), player of gridiron football
Steve Potts (born 1967), former West Ham United footballer, current U21 coach
Ryan Preece (born 1990), NASCAR driver
Eugene Robinson (born 1963), NFL player
 Will Solomon (born 1978), basketball player
John Sullivan (born 1961), NFL player
Roderick G. (Rod) Taylor (1943–2014), Olympic skier
Tony Younger (born 1980), American-Israeli basketball player in the Israeli National League

Sports broadcasters
 Steve Berthiaume, ESPN anchor
 Mike Crispino, sportscaster for WVIT and WRCH, and ESPN
 Jason Jackson, hosted a local sports radio show on ESPN Radio 
 Charley Steiner, Los Angeles Dodgers sportscaster

Other
A. Everett "Chick" Austin (1900–1957), arts innovator and director of the Wadsworth Atheneum
Julie Banderas (born 1973), Emmy Award-winning, television news anchor
Nathaniel Bar-Jonah (1957–2008), convicted child molester and a suspected serial killer and cannibal
William Bryden (1880–1972), U.S. Army major general
Reverend Horace Bushnell (1802–1876), Hartford civic champion
Samuel Colt (1814–1862), firearm inventor
Austin Cornelius Dunham, businessman who was chief executive officer of Hartford Electric Light Company.
John H. Griebel (1901–1969), Marine Corps General
George Keller (1842–1935), architect, noted for Hartford's Soldiers' and Sailors' Arch and Hartford Union Station
Stephen Cole Kleene (1909–1994), mathematician
Howard Long (1905–1939), convicted murderer and child molester
Rachel Taylor Milton, community activist and Connecticut Women's Hall of Fame inductee
J.P. Morgan (1837–1913), financier and industrialist
Joseph B. Murdock (1851–1931), US Navy Rear Admiral
Frederick Law Olmsted (1822–1903), urban planner, noted for many of the New York City parks and Stanford University's campus
Colonel Albert A. Pope (1843–1909), Manufacturer of Pope Manufacturing Company automobiles and bicycles
Martha Bulloch Roosevelt (1835–1884), mother of president Theodore Roosevelt and grandmother of Eleanor Roosevelt
Spencer Shaw (1916–2010), librarian and professor at the University of Washington
Colonel Sherwood C. Spring (born 1944), United States Army Colonel, test pilot and astronaut
Griffin Alexander Stedman (1838–1864), Union Army Colonel
Alfred Terry (1827–1890), Union army general
Robert O. Tyler (1831–1874), Union army general
Donald M. Weller (1908–1985), Marine Corps General and pioneer in Naval gunfire support
Amos Whitney (1832–1920), mechanical engineer, inventor and co-founder of Pratt & Whitney company
Theodore Wirth (1863–1949), horticulturalist and park planner

See also
 List of people from Connecticut
 List of people from Bridgeport, Connecticut
 List of people from Brookfield, Connecticut
 List of people from Darien, Connecticut
 List of people from Greenwich, Connecticut
 List of people from New Canaan, Connecticut
 List of people from New Haven, Connecticut
 List of people from Norwalk, Connecticut
 List of people from Redding, Connecticut
 List of people from Ridgefield, Connecticut
 List of people from Stamford, Connecticut
 List of people from Westport, Connecticut

Notes

Hartford, Connecticut
Hartford, Connecticut